In Norse mythology, Búri, is a divinity god 'producer, father' of all other gods, and an early ancestor of the Æsir gods of the principal pantheon in Norse religion. Búri was licked free from salty rime stones by the primeval cow Auðumbla over the course of three days. Búri's background beyond this point is unattested, and he had a son, Borr, by way of an unknown process. Búri is attested in the Prose Edda, composed in the 13th century by Icelander Snorri Sturluson. The Prose Edda includes a quote from a 12th-century poem by skald Þórvaldr Blönduskáld that mentions the figure. Búri's mysterious origins are the subject of scholarly commentary and interpretation.

Attestations
Buridava was a fort and sanctuary in the Roman province of Dacia on the Danube.
The name Buri is attested by the ninth tabula of Europe of Ptolemy's Geography and Trajan campaign, Cassius Dio and inscriptions. 

Búri receives mention twice in the Prose Edda—once in Gylfaginning and again in a skaldic poem quoted in Skáldskaparmál. The Gylfaginning section reads as follows:

Búri is mentioned nowhere in the Poetic Edda and only once in the skaldic corpus. In Skáldskaparmál Snorri quotes the following verse by the 12th century skald Þórvaldr blönduskáld:

Notes and citations

References

 Ásgeir Blöndal Magnússon (1989). Íslensk orðsifjabók. Reykjavík: Orðabók Háskólans.
 Brodeur, Arthur Gilchrist (transl.) (1916). The Prose Edda by Snorri Sturluson. New York: The American-Scandinavian Foundation. Available online at Google Books.
 Eysteinn Björnsson (ed.) (2005). Snorra-Edda: Formáli & Gylfaginning : Textar fjögurra meginhandrita. https://web.archive.org/web/20080611212105/http://www.hi.is/~eybjorn/gg/
 Faulkes, Anthony (transl.) (1987). Edda. London: J. M. Dent. .
 Finnur Jónsson (1931). Lexicon Poeticum. København: S. L. Møllers Bogtrykkeri.
 Finnur Jónsson (1912–15). Den norsk-islandske skjaldedigtning. København: Den arnamagnæanske kommission. Edition of Þórvaldr's fragments available at https://web.archive.org/web/20080306035446/http://www.hi.is/~eybjorn/ugm/skindex/tblond.html.
 Lindow, John (2001). Norse Mythology: A Guide to the Gods, Heroes, Rituals, and Beliefs. Oxford University Press. 
 Simek, Rudolf (2007) translated by Angela Hall. Dictionary of Northern Mythology. D.S. Brewer.

External links
MyNDIR (My Norse Digital Image Repository) Illustrations of Búri from manuscripts and early print books. Clicking on the thumbnail will give you the full image and information concerning it.

Æsir
Norse gods